Freedom is the fifteenth studio album by the American rock band Journey, released on July 8, 2022, through BMG Rights Management and Frontiers Records. It is the band's second album to date not to feature founding bassist Ross Valory, who was dismissed in 2020; he is replaced by Randy Jackson, who was last on Raised on Radio (1986). With fifteen songs and a run time of one hour and thirteen minutes, it is the longest Journey album ever released, excluding compilations.

Upon its release Freedom received mixed critical reviews – despite the performances and musicianship receiving near-universal praise, criticism was directed at its production, mixing and length.

Background and title
The album's 11-year gap from Eclipse (2011) marked the longest between two Journey albums to date. It is the only Journey album to feature drummer and producer Narada Michael Walden, as well as the first album to feature bassist Randy Jackson since Raised on Radio (1986).  Both departed the group before its release. 

The album's title of Freedom was the original title of the group's 1986 album Raised on Radio, but was changed by then lead singer Steve Perry.

Track listing

Personnel
Journey
 Neal Schon – guitars, backing vocals, keyboards
 Jonathan Cain – keyboards (except "All Day and All Night" and "Don't Go"), backing vocals, synth bass on "Still Believe in Love"
 Arnel Pineda – lead vocals (except "After Glow")
 Randy Jackson – bass (except "Still Believe in Love"), backing vocals 
 Narada Michael Walden – drums, backing vocals, keyboards
 Jason Derlatka – backing vocals on tracks 5, 6, 9, 12, 14, 15
 Deen Castronovo – lead vocals on "After Glow"

Production
 Neal Schon, Jonathan Cain, Narada Michael Walden – production
 Bob Clearmountain, Adam Ayan, Jim Reitzel, Keith Gretlein, David Kalmusky – engineering

Charts

References

2022 albums
Albums produced by Narada Michael Walden
BMG Rights Management albums
Frontiers Records albums
Journey (band) albums